The Great Musi Flood was a devastating flood that occurred on 28 September 1908 in Hyderabad on the banks of Musi river. The city of Hyderabad was the capital of the Hyderabad State, ruled by the Nizam, Mir Mahbub Ali Khan.

The flood, locally known as Thughyani Sitambar, shattered the life of the people living in Hyderabad, killing 50,000 people  It washed away three bridges — the Afzal, Mussallam Jung and Chaderghat — the Puranapul became the only link between two parts of the city.

Flooding of Hyderabad

The Musi river was the cause of frequent flood devastation of Hyderabad city till early 20th century. It had begun to swell dangerously on 27 September. The first flood warning came at 2 AM when the water flowed over Puranapul bridge. By 6 AM there was a cloudburst. The flood breached on Tuesday, 28 September 1908: The river rose 60 feet, flowing through the city.

Damage

The worst hit area was Kolsawadi and Ghansi Bazar in Afzal Gunj. The flood razed over 80,000 houses, making a fourth of the population homeless. It completely destroyed the Nizam Hospital, burying the patients. It washed away the Afzal, Mussallam Jung and Chaderghat bridges, all built in the 1860s.

A 200-year-old tamarind tree inside Osmania Hospital saved over 150 people who climbed it. Popular Urdu poet Amjad Hyderabadi, 22, saw his entire family, including his mother, wife and daughter washed away in the flood; he was the only survivor in his family. Most of his Ruba'i, Qayamat-e-Soghra reflects his depression at the loss. A couplet muses:

Relief Efforts
A relief fund of 500,000 Rupees was borne by the state, and 1,000,000 more raised by public subscription, with the Nizam and Kishen Pershad making the largest donations. The government declared an official holiday of ten days for people to deal with their own crises. Ten kitchens were set up in various parts of the city, which were in operation from 29 September to 13 October.

Aftermath
The historic deluge resulted in the development of the twin cities in 1908. This necessitated planned, phased development.

Committee recommendations
Syed Azam Hussaini submitted his report on 1 October 1909, with recommendations on preventing a recurrence of floods and improving civic amenities. The Seventh Nizam, Mir Osman Ali Khan, constituted a City Improve Trust in 1912. He built a flood control system on the river.

Sir Visvesvaraya’s services
The Nizam invited M. Visvesvaraya to advise and assist in the reconstruction of the city and to devise measures for the prevention of the recurrence of such a terrible catastrophe. He was assisted by engineers from the Public Works Department of Hyderabad State, and after much investigation and deliberation, they concluded that the immunity of Hyderabad city from flood must come from the construction of flood catchment areas in the basin above the city. They proposed to construct these reservoirs a few miles north of the capital.

In 1927, another reservoir was built on Esi (tributary of Musi) and named Himayat Sagar. These lakes prevent the flooding of the River Musi and are major drinking water sources for Hyderabad city.

References

Citations

Bibliography

External links
 Remembering the deluge of 1908

Hyderabad State
Floods in India
1908 in India
1908 floods in Asia
History of Telangana
History of Hyderabad, India
1908 disasters in India